Adrian Ward Farmer (14 March 1895 – 5 August 1964) was an Australian rules footballer who played with University in the Victorian Football League (VFL).

Born in Melbourne to Paul Ward Farmer and Helena Joyce, Farmer was educated at Trinity Grammar School. He later studied medicine at the University of Melbourne. While a first year student, Farmer player a solitary VFL game in the second last round of the 1914 VFL season, scoring two goals as an undermanned University team were defeated by Fitzroy. He also played district cricket for University from 1914 to 1919.

Farmer enlisted to serve in World War I in June 1918 but was never called up and was demobilised in December 1918.

After completing his medical studies Farmer moved to Western Australia and commenced practice in Perth, specialising in ear, nose and throat conditions. He married Jean Saltau on 4 April 1922.

Farmer later served in World War II as Commanding Officer of the 2/4th Casualty Clearing Station in Tampoi, Johor, Malaysia and was taken as a prisoner of war by the Japanese, spending over three years in prison before being released at the end of the war.

Farmer died in Perth on 5 August 1964.

References

External links

1895 births
People educated at Trinity Grammar School, Kew
Australian rules footballers from Melbourne
University Football Club players
20th-century Australian medical doctors
1964 deaths
Medical doctors from Melbourne
University of Melbourne alumni sportspeople
Australian military personnel of World War II
World War II prisoners of war held by Japan
Military personnel from Western Australia